Neen Savage is a civil parish in Shropshire, England.  It contains 17 listed buildings that are recorded in the National Heritage List for England.  Of these, two are at Grade II*, the middle of the three grades, and the others are at Grade II, the lowest grade.  The parish contains the village of Neen Savage and the surrounding countryside.  The oldest listed building is the church, which originated in the 12th century.  Most of the other listed buildings are houses, cottages, farm houses and farm buildings, the earliest of which are timber framed.  The other listed buildings are a vicarage and a war memorial.
 

Key

Buildings

References

Citations

Sources

Lists of buildings and structures in Shropshire